The 1951 Davidson Wildcats football team was an American football team that represented Davidson College as a member of the Southern Conference (SoCon) during the 1951 college football season. Led by Crowell Little in his second and final year as head coach, the Wildcats compiled an overall record of 1–8 with a mark of 1–5 in conference play, placing 16th in the SoCon.

Schedule

References

Davidson
Davidson Wildcats football seasons
Davidson Wildcats football